Pharyngodonidae is a family of nematodes belonging to the order Oxyurida.

Genera

Genera:
 Alaeuris Tharpar, 1925
 Ataronema Hasegawa, 2005
 Batracholandros Freitas & Ibáñez, 1965

References

Nematodes